Saul Bernard Marantz (July 11, 1911 – January 17, 1997) was an American musician, inventor, and engineer who founded audio manufacturer Marantz in 1948.

Marantz was a fellow of the Audio Engineering Society. He is considered a pioneer in developing hi-fi audio technology.

Career
In the early 1950s, he founded an audio manufacturer Marantz with one product, Model One. The company was acquired by Superscope Inc. in 1964. He served as the president of Marantz since its founding till 1968.

References

1911 births
1997 deaths
20th-century American Jews
American audio engineers
United States Army personnel of World War II
Musicians from New York City
People from Bridgewater Township, New Jersey
Engineers from New York (state)
Engineers from New Jersey
20th-century American engineers
20th-century American inventors